The 1967 winners of the Torneo di Viareggio (in English, the Viareggio Tournament, officially the Viareggio Cup World Football Tournament Coppa Carnevale), the annual youth football tournament held in Viareggio, Tuscany, are listed below.

Format
The 16 teams are organized in knockout rounds. The round of 16 are played in two-legs, while the rest of the rounds are single tie.

Participating teams

Italian teams

  Bologna
  Brescia
  Fiorentina
  Juventus
  Milan
  Napoli
  Roma
  Torino

European teams

  Eintracht Frankfurt
  Dukla Praha
  Red Star Belgrade
  Vojvodina
  Burevestnik
  Stade de Reims
  CSKA Sofia
  Barcelona

Tournament fixtures

Champions

Footnotes

External links
 Official Site (Italian)
 Results on RSSSF.com

1967
1966–67 in Italian football
1966–67 in Yugoslav football
1966–67 in Spanish football
1966–67 in German football
1966–67 in Czechoslovak football
1966–67 in French football
1966–67 in Bulgarian football
1967 in Soviet football